Piero Pierantoni Cámpora (24 October 1932 in Genoa – 10 September 2009 in Lima) was a Peruvian politician in the early 1980s. He was the Mayor of Lima from 1980 to 1981.

References

Mayors of Lima
1932 births
2009 deaths
Italian emigrants to Peru